George Glasgow (September 26, 1931 – October 28, 2013) was an American basketball player and soccer coach. He served as the head coach of the Fairleigh Dickinson Knights men's soccer team from 1956 to 1969 and 1974 to 1976.

Raised in Kearny, New Jersey, Glasgow graduated from Kearny High School in 1949.

Glasgow played college basketball for the Fairleigh Dickinson Knights from 1950 to 1953 and became the program's first player to score 1,000 career points. He was selected by the Fort Wayne Pistons as the 10th overall pick of the 1953 NBA draft but he never played in the National Basketball Association (NBA) as he instead served in the United States Army during the Korean War. He returned to Fairleigh Dickinson University to earn his bachelor's degree and attended Columbia University for his master's degree. In 1956, Glasgow was hired as head coach of the Fairleigh Dickinson Knights men's soccer team. During his two stints with the Knights, he guided the team to eight post-season tournaments: a National Association of Intercollegiate Athletics (NAIA) tournament appearance in 1958 followed by seven NCAA tournament berths. He amassed a 130–51–17 record over 17 seasons.

Glasgow was an inaugural member of Fairleigh Dickinson University's Athletics Hall of Fame in 1999.

References

1931 births
2013 deaths
American men's basketball players
American soccer coaches
Basketball players from New Jersey
Fairleigh Dickinson Knights men's soccer coaches
Fairleigh Dickinson Knights men's basketball players
Fort Wayne Pistons draft picks
Guards (basketball)
Kearny High School (New Jersey) alumni
People from Kearny, New Jersey
Sportspeople from Hudson County, New Jersey